Simple Complex is a jazz album of original compositions by Pianist Jon Weber, featuring an unusual ensemble of well-known musicians. Simple Complex was released in 2004 to international critical acclaim. The album featured Weber on piano, drummer Mark Walker, Eric Alexander on sax, trumpeters Diego Urcola and Roy Hargrove, bassists Avishai Cohen, the late Niels-Henning Ørsted Pedersen, Peter Washington and Gary Burton on vibraphone.

The Chicago Tribune rated Simple Complex as the number one Jazz CD of 2004. Jazziz ranked it among the top ten CDs of the year. Weber composed all songs on the album, released on the 2nd Century Jazz Label.

A cut from the album "No More Words" was featured on the Jazziz Magazine CD in February 2005.

External links
Article about the album
[ Album listing at Allmusic]
Album website
Jon Weber's website

2004 albums
Jazz albums by American artists